The Verdugo is a river   in the province of Pontevedra, Galicia, in north-western Spain. The river ends in the Atlantic Ocean, at Pontevedra.

See also
 Rivers of Galicia

Rivers of Spain
Verdugo